Mehmet Cemil Uybadın (1880, Constantinople, Ottoman Empire – 1957) was a Turkish career officer and politician.

Biography
He was born in 1880 in Constantinople. In 1905, he completed his military education and became a staff captain. He participated in the Balkan Wars and World War I. He carried out various duties in the Turkish War of Independence. He retired when he was promoted to lieutenant colonel. From 1923, he was in the Turkish parliament as a deputy from Tekirdağ. He served as the secretary general of the Republican People's Party (CHP) (1924-25) and as the interior minister (1925-27). As Minister for the Interior, he was part of the Reform Council for the East that prepared the Report for Reform in the East which recommended the suppression and resettlement of the Kurds and the creation of Inspectorates-Generals which would include provinces with a Kurdish population. Following this report, three Inspectorates-Generals were to be created. He died in 1957.

References

1880 births
1957 deaths
Republican People's Party (Turkey) politicians
Members of the 3rd government of Turkey
Members of the 4th government of Turkey
Ministers of the Interior of Turkey
Ottoman military personnel of the Balkan Wars
Ottoman military personnel of World War I
Military personnel from Istanbul
Deputies of Tekirdağ